Elma Postma (born 6 September 1978) is a South African actress and presenter. She is best known for her roles in the series 7de Laan, Farmer Wants a Wife, and Isidingo.

Personal life
She was born on 6 September 1978 in South Africa.

She is married to her longtime partner Paul Potgieter.

Career
In 2000, she made her television debut in the popular soapie 7de Laan where she played the role of 'Dezi Terreblanche'. She eventually left the show in June 2007. Other than television, she appeared several popular films such as The Mating Game in 2010, Wonderlus in 2017, and 'n Man Soos My Pa in 2015. In the film The Mating Game, she starred as lead role 'Sara van Graan' which gained so much popularity. In 2011, she joined the cast of kykNET soap opera Binneland which was initially referred to as Binnelanders. In the serial, she played the lead role 'Bea'.

Apart from acting, Postma is a prolific singer who is a renowned cello player. She's graced the covers of several magazines in South Africa including: Rooi Rose, Huisgenoot, Sarie, TV Plus, Vrouekeur, TimeOut,  Tydskrif, Insig, and Leef.

She made her film debut in 2011 as Sister Suzaan in the film Superhelde. Her presenting debut was on the kykNET breakfast TV program 'Ontbytsake'. She followed this up by presenting the first three seasons of the reality show 'Boer Soek 'n Vrou'. She's starred in several theatre productions at art festivals, including Heart Sins in 2004 directed by Henry Mylne, Haaks in 2005, Monsters in 2006 directed by Pierre van Pletzen and Hell on Heaven and Earth directed by Vicky Davis. In 2014, she joined the radio broadcast of Die Nag van Legio.

Lion accident
On 18 February 2006, she was bitten by a lion her family visits a lion farm near Klerksdorp. She moved closer to tame lions through the fence when her ring got caught in one of the lion’s claws. When she attempted to dislodge the ring from the claw, tamed lion distressed and bit her hand. Her fingers were damaged largely where doctors however managed to repair the damaged fingers.

Filmography

References

External links
 

Living people
South African television actresses
1978 births
South African film actresses
South African television personalities